Maipo  is a town  that it is part of the city of Buin. It is one of the first towns that arose in Chile, founded in 1583.

References

Populated places in Maipo Province